Birgitta Holm may refer to:

 Birgitta Holm (author)
 Birgitta Holm (convert)